Brasstown Valley Resort & Spa is a 134 room resort just north of Young Harris, Georgia, surrounded by the Blue Ridge Mountains at  elevation. The property is adjacent to Brasstown Bald, the highest mountain in Georgia.  Brasstown Valley Resort is the  home to a links style championship golf course which has hosted numerous tournaments including the LPGA Futures.  The resort also features the  Equani Spa opened in Oct '08, and the Stables at Brasstown Valley Resort featuring  of riding trails.  Brasstown Valley Resort features  of hiking trails including a trail that directly connects to the world famous Appalachian Trail that begins in Georgia and ends in Maine.

References

External links
Official website

Resorts in the United States
Buildings and structures in Towns County, Georgia
Tourist attractions in Towns County, Georgia